Mang Lang Church (in Vietnamese: Nhà thờ Mằng Lăng) is a Roman Catholic church in Vietnam, Phú Yên Province, 35 km from Tuy Hòa.

The church was built in 1892 by French missionary Father Joseph Lacassagne in gothic style. This place was the native village of blessed Andrew of Phu Yen beheaded in 1644. It is now an important shrine, as Andrew was declared Patron of the youth.

Alexander de Rhodes wrote here his Cathechismus in octo dies in Latin and Vietnamese (Quốc ngữ) and printed it in 1651.

References 
 History and photographs of the church

French colonial architecture in Vietnam
Buildings and structures in Phú Yên province
1892 establishments in the French colonial empire
19th-century Roman Catholic church buildings in Vietnam
Roman Catholic churches completed in 1892